Ecaterina is a Romanian female first name meaning Catherine. Notable persons with that name include:

Ecaterina Andronescu (born 1948), Romanian politician and engineer
Ecaterina Arbore ( 1874 – 1937), Romanian-Soviet communist activist and official
Ecaterina Nazare (born 1953), Romanian actress
Ecaterina Szabo (born 1967), Romanian-Hungarian gymnast
Ecaterina Teodoroiu (1894–1917), Romanian heroine of World War I
Ecaterina Varga (1802 – after 1852), Hungarian leader of the Transylvanian Miners' Movement

Romanian feminine given names
Given names
Unisex given names